Eve (Syriac:  romanized) is a figure in the Book of Genesis in the Hebrew Bible. According to the origin story of the Abrahamic religions, she was the first woman, yet some debate within Judaism has also given that position to Lilith. Eve is known also as Adam's wife.

According to the second chapter of Genesis, Eve was created by God (Yahweh) by taking her from the rib of Adam, to be Adam's companion. Adam is charged with guarding and keeping the garden before her creation; she is not present when God commands Adam not to eat the forbidden fruit – although it is clear that she was aware of the command. She decides to eat the forbidden fruit from the tree of the knowledge of good and evil after she hears the serpent's argument that it would not kill her but bring her benefits. She shares the fruit with Adam, and before they could eat of the tree of life, they are expelled from the Garden of Eden. Christian churches differ on how they view both Adam and Eve's disobedience to God (often called the fall of man), and to the consequences that those actions had on the rest of humanity. Christian and Jewish teachings sometimes hold Adam (the first man) and Eve to a different level of responsibility for the "fall."

The Catholic Church by ancient tradition recognizes Eve as a saint, alongside Adam, and the traditional liturgical feast of Saints Adam and Eve has been celebrated on 24 December since the Middle Ages in many European nations, including Estonia, Germany, Hungary, Lithuania, and the Scandinavian nations.

Etymology

"Eve" in Hebrew is "Ḥawwāh" and is most commonly believed to mean "living one" or "source of life" as it is phonetically similar to "ḥāyâ", "to live", from the Semitic root ḥyw.

Hawwāh has been compared to the Hurrian goddess Ḫepat, who was shown in the Amarna letters to be worshipped in Jerusalem during the Late Bronze Age. It has been suggested that the name Ḫepat may derive from Kubau, a woman who was the first ruler of the Third Dynasty of Kish.

It has been suggested that the Hebrew name Eve also bears resemblance to an Aramaic word for "snake" (Old Aramaic language ; Aramaic ). The origin for this etymological hypothesis is the rabbinic pun present in Genesis Rabbah 20:11, utilizing the similarity between Heb. Ḥawwāh and Aram. ḥiwyāʾ. Notwithstanding its rabbinic ideological usage, scholars like Julius Wellhausen and Theodor Nöldeke argued for its etymological relevance.

Gerda Lerner  postulates that the story of Eve's birth from Adam's rib may have originated in the Mesopotamian myth of Enki and Ninhursag. In this myth, Enki eats poisonous plants that give him diseases. His wife, Ninhursag, then creates several deities to cure each of these ailments. One of them, Ninti, is destined to heal Enki's rib. Ninti's name means both "the lady of the rib" and "the lady of life". This association of rib and life is similar to that found in Eve, whose name is linked to life and who was born of a rib.

In Genesis

Creation

In Genesis 2:18–22, the woman is created to be ezer ki-negdo, a term that is notably difficult to translate, to the man. Ki-negdo means "alongside, opposite, a counterpart to him", and ezer means active intervention on behalf of the other person. The woman is called ishah, woman, with an explanation that this is because she was taken from ish, meaning "man"; the two words are not in fact connected. Later, after the story of the Garden is complete, she will be given a name, Ḥawwāh (Eve). This means "living" in Hebrew, from a root that can also mean "snake". A long-standing exegetical tradition holds that the use of a rib from man's side emphasizes that both man and woman have equal dignity, for woman was created from the same material as man, shaped and given life by the same processes. In fact, the word traditionally translated "rib" in English can also mean side, chamber, or beam. Rib is a pun in Sumerian, as the word "" means both "rib" and "life".

God created Eve from ’aḥat miṣṣal‘otaiv, traditionally translated as "one of his ribs". The term can mean curve, limp, adversity and side. The traditional reading has been questioned recently by feminist theologians who suggest it should instead be rendered as "side", supporting the idea that woman is man's equal and not his subordinate. Such a reading shares elements in common with Aristophanes' story of the origin of love and the separation of the sexes in Plato's Symposium. A recent suggestion, based upon observations that men and women have the same number of ribs, speculates that the bone was the baculum, a small structure found in the penis of many mammals, but not in humans.

Expulsion from Eden

Eve is found in the Genesis 3 expulsion from Eden narrative which is characterized as a parable or "wisdom tale" in the wisdom tradition. This narrative portion is attributed to Yahwist (J) by the documentary hypothesis due to the use of YHWH.

In the expulsion from Eden narrative a dialogue is exchanged between a legged serpent and the woman (3:1–5). The serpent is identified in 2:19 as an animal that was made by Yahweh among the beasts of the field. The woman is willing to talk to the serpent and respond to the creature's cynicism by repeating Yahweh's prohibition from 2:17. The serpent directly disputes Yahweh's command. Adam and the woman sin (3:6–8). Yahweh questions Adam, who blames the woman (3:9–13). Yahweh then challenges the woman to explain herself, who blames the serpent, who is cursed to crawl on its belly, so losing its limbs.

Divine pronouncement of three judgments are then laid against all culprits (3:14–19). A judgement oracle and the nature of the crime is first laid upon the serpent, then the woman, and finally Adam. After the serpent is cursed by Yahweh, the woman receives a penalty that impacts two primary roles: childbearing and her subservient relationship to her husband. Adam's penalty then follows. The reaction of Adam, the naming of Eve, and Yahweh making skin garments are described in a concise narrative (3:20–21). The garden account ends with an Elohim conversation, determining the couple's expulsion, and the execution of that deliberation (3:22–24).

Mother of humanity
Eve (and womankind after her) is sentenced to a life of sorrow and travail in childbirth, and to be under the power of her husband. Adam and Eve had two sons, Cain and Abel (Qayin and Heḇel), the first a tiller of the ground, the second a keeper of sheep. After the death of Abel, Eve gave birth to a third son, Seth (Šet), from whom Noah (and thus the whole of modern humanity) is descended. According to Genesis, Seth was born when Adam was 130 years old "a son in his likeness and like his image".  Genesis 5:4 says that Eve had sons and daughters beyond just Cain, Abel, and Seth.

In other works
Certain concepts such as the serpent being identified as Satan, Eve's sin being sexual temptation, or Adam's first wife being Lilith, come from literary works found in various Jewish apocrypha, but not found anywhere in the Book of Genesis or the Torah itself. She is remembered in De Mulieribus Claris, a collection of biographies of historical and mythological women by the Florentine author Giovanni Boccaccio, composed in 136162. It is notable as the first collection devoted exclusively to biographies of women in Western literature.

Writings dealing with these subjects are extant literature in Greek, Latin, Slavonic, Syriac, Armenian and Arabic, going back to ancient Jewish thought. Their influential concepts were then adopted into Christian theology, but not into modern Judaism. This marked a radical split between the two religions. Some of the oldest Jewish portions of apocrypha are called Primary Adam Literature where some works became Christianized. Examples of Christianized works is The Book of Adam and Eve, known as the Conflict of Adam and Eve with Satan, translated from the Ethiopian Ge'ez by Solomon Caesar Malan (1882) and an original Syriac work entitled Cave of Treasures which has close affinities to the Conflict as noted by August Dillmann.

 In the Jewish book The Alphabet of Ben-Sira, Eve is Adam's "second wife", where Lilith is his first. In this alternate version, which entered Europe from the East in the 6th century, it suggests that Lilith was created at the same time, from the same earth (Sumerian Ki), as Adam's equal, similar to the Babylonian Lilitu, Sumerian Ninlil wife of Enlil. Lilith refuses to sleep or serve under Adam. When Adam tried to force her into the "inferior" position, she flew away from Eden into the air where she copulated with demons, conceiving hundreds more each day (a derivation of the Arabic djinn). God sent three angels after her, who threatened to kill her brood if she refused to return to Adam. She refuses, leaving God to make a second wife for Adam, except this time from his rib.
 The Life of Adam and Eve, and its Greek version Apocalypse of Moses, is a group of Jewish pseudepigraphical writings that recount the lives of Adam and Eve after their expulsion from the Garden of Eden to their deaths.
 The deuterocanonical Book of Tobit affirms that Eve was given to Adam as a helper (viii, 8; Sept., viii, 6).

Religious views

Judaism
In the first creation narrative (Elohim) account, it says "male and female [Elohim] created them" (Genesis 1:27), which has been interpreted to imply simultaneous creation of the man and the woman. Whereas the second creation account states that YHWH created Eve from Adam's rib, because he was lonely (Genesis 2:18 ff.). Thus to resolve this apparent discrepancy, some medieval rabbis suggested that Eve from the second account, and the woman of the Elohim account, were two separate individuals: Eve and Lilith.

The creation of Eve, according to Rabbi Joshua, is that: "God deliberated from what member He would create woman, and He reasoned with Himself thus: I must not create her from Adam's head, for she would be a proud person, and hold her head high. If I create her from the eye, then she will wish to pry into all things; if from the ear, she will wish to hear all things; if from the mouth, she will talk much; if from the heart, she will envy people; if from the hand, she will desire to take all things; if from the feet, she will be a gadabout. Therefore, I will create her from the member which is hid, that is the rib, which is not even seen when man is naked."

According to the Midrash of Genesis Rabba and other later sources, either Cain had a twin sister, and Abel had two twin sisters, or Cain had a twin sister named Lebuda, and Abel a twin sister named Qelimath. The traditional Jewish belief is that Eve is buried in the Cave of Machpelah.

Midrash Rabbah Genesis VIII:1 interprets "male and female He created them" to mean that God originally created Adam as a hermaphrodite. In this way, adam was bodily and spiritually male and female. God later decides that "it is not good for adam to be alone", and creates the separate beings, Adam and Eve. This promotes the idea of two people joining to achieve a union of the two separate spirits.

The early rabbinic literature contains also the traditions which portray Eve in a less positive manner. According to Genesis Rabbah 18:4 Adam quickly realizes that Eve is destined to engage in constant quarrels with him. The first woman also becomes the object of accusations ascribed to Rabbi Joshua of Siknin, according to whom Eve, despite the divine efforts, turned out to be “swelled-headed, coquette, eavesdropper, gossip, prone to jealousy, light-fingered and gadabout” (ibid. 18:2). A similar set of charges appears in Genesis Rabbah 17:8, according to which Eve's creation from Adam's rib rather than from the earth makes her inferior to Adam and never satisfied with anything. Finally, the gravest evils attributed to Eve appear in Genesis Rabbah 17:8:Why does a man go out bareheaded while a woman goes out with her head covered? She is like one who has done wrong and is ashamed of people; therefore she goes out with her head covered. Why do they [the women] walk in front of the corpse [at a funeral]? Because they brought death into the world, they therefore walk in front of the corpse, [as it is written], “For he is borne to the grave ... and all men draw after him, as there were innumerable before him” (Job 21:32f). And why was the precept of menstruation (nidah) given to her? Because she shed the blood of Adam [by causing death], therefore was the precept of menstruation given to her. And why was the precept of “dough” (ḥalah) given to her? Because she corrupted Adam, who was the dough of the world, therefore was the precept of dough given to her. And why was the precept of the Sabbath lights (nerot shabat) given to her? Because she extinguished the soul of Adam, therefore was the precept of the Sabbath lights given to her.In addition to this, the early rabbinic literature contains numerous instances in which Eve is accused of various sexual transgressions. Told in Genesis 3:16 that “your desire shall be for your husband,” she is accused by the Rabbis of having an overdeveloped sexual drive (Genesis Rabbah 20:7) and constantly enticing Adam (ibid. 23:5). However, in terms of textual popularity and dissemination, the motif of Eve copulating with the primeval serpent takes priority over her other sexual transgressions. Despite rather unsettling picturesqueness of this account, it is conveyed in numerous places: Genesis Rabbah 18:6, Sotah 9b, Shabat 145b–146a and 196a, Yevamot 103b and ‘Avodah zarah 22b.

Christianity
Some Early Church Fathers interpreted 2Cor.11:3 and 1Tim.2:13–14 that the Apostle Paul promoted the silence and submission of women due to Eve's deception by the serpent, her tempting Adam to eat the fatal fruit, and transgressing by eating of the fruit herself.

Tertullian told his female listeners, in the early 2nd century, that they "are the devil's gateway", and went on to explain that all women are responsible for the death of Christ: "On account of your desert – that is, death – even the Son of God had to die." Saint Augustine, in his excursuses on the fall narrative in Genesis, which led to the Catholic doctrine of original sin, blamed Adam for sin rather than Eve. His reasoning was that, because sin lies in the soul and not the body and because he understood reproductive intercourse to comprise a material (bodily) contribution from the female and a spiritual (soul) contribution from the male, then original sin could not be based upon the transgressions of Eve. Rather, her sin was both forgivable, because she was deceived by the serpent, and lacked consequences for human history, because she could not transmit sin to her descendants. Adam, on the other hand, had full knowledge of his sin and out of lust chose a life of sin with the woman over a life with God. This Augustinian teaching is also rooted in Paul: "sin entered the world through one man." (Rom 5:12). Gregory of Tours reported that in the Third Council of Mâcon (585 CE), attended by 43 bishops, one bishop maintained that woman could not be included under the term "man" as she was responsible for Adam's sin, and had a deficient soul. However, his case was declined and did not press the issue further.

Eve, in Christian art, is most usually portrayed as the temptress of Adam, and often during the Renaissance the serpent in the Garden is portrayed as having a woman's face identical to that of Eve. She was also compared with the Greco-Roman myth of Pandora who was responsible for bringing evil into the world.

Some Christians claim monogamy is implied in the story of Adam and Eve as one woman is created for one man. Eve's being taken from his side implies not only her secondary role in the conjugal state (1 Corinthians 11:9), but also emphasizes the intimate union between husband and wife, and the dependence of her to him.

In conventional Christianity, Eve is a prefigurement of Mary, mother of Jesus who is also sometimes called "the Second Eve".

Gnosticism
In Gnosticism, Eve is often seen as the embodiment of the supreme feminine principle, called Barbelo. She is equated with the light-maiden of Sophia, creator of the word (Logos) of God, the thygater tou photos or simply the Virgin Maiden, Parthenos. In other texts she is equated with Zoe (Life). In other Gnostic texts, such as the Hypostasis of the Archons, the Pistis Sophia is equated with Eve's daughter, Norea, the wife of Seth.

Islam

Adam's spouse is mentioned in the Quran in 2:30–39, 7:11–25, 15:26–42, 17:61–65, 18:50-51, 20:110–124, and 38:71–85, but the name "Eve" (Arabic: , Ḥawwā’) is never revealed or used in the Quran. Eve is mentioned by name only in hadith.

Accounts of Adam and Eve in Islamic texts, which include the Quran and the books of Sunnah, are similar but different from those of the Torah and Bible. The Quran relates an account in which God created "one soul and created from it its mate and dispersed from both of them many men and women" (Q4:1), but there are hadiths that support the creation of woman "from a rib" (Sahih Bukhari 4:55:548, Sahih Bukhari 7:62:114, Sahih Muslim 8:3467, Sahih Muslim 8:3468). Eve is not blamed for enticing Adam to eat the forbidden fruit (nor is there the concept of original sin). On the contrary, the Quran indicates that "they ate of it" and were both to blame for that transgression (Quran 20:121–122).

There are subsequent hadiths (narrated by Abu Hurairah), the authenticity of which is contested, that hold that Muhammad designates Eve as the epitome of female betrayal. "Narrated Abu Hurrairah: The Prophet said, 'Were it not for Bani Israel, meat would not decay; and were it not for Eve, no woman would ever betray her husband.'" (Sahih Bukhari, Hadith 611, Volume 55). An identical but more explicit version is found in the second most respected book of prophetic narrations, Sahih Muslim. "Abu Hurrairah reported Allah's Messenger as saying: Had it not been for Eve, woman would have never acted unfaithfully towards her husband." (Hadith 3471, Volume 8).

Baháʼí Faith
In the Baháʼí Faith, the account of Eve is described in Some Answered Questions. `Abdu'l-Bahá describes Eve as a symbol of the soul and as containing divine mysteries. The Baháʼí Faith claims the account of Eve in previous Abrahamic traditions is metaphorical.

Historicity 

While a traditional view was that the Book of Genesis was authored by Moses and has been considered historical and metaphorical, modern scholars consider the Genesis creation narrative as one of various ancient origin myths.

Analysis like the documentary hypothesis also suggests that the text is a result of the compilation of multiple previous traditions, explaining apparent contradictions. Other stories of the same canonical book, like the Genesis flood narrative, are also understood as having been influenced by older literature, with parallels in the older Epic of Gilgamesh.

With scientific developments in paleontology, biology, genetics and other disciplines, it was discovered that humans, and all other living things, share a common ancestor and evolved through natural processes, over billions of years to diversify into the life forms we know today.

In biology, the most recent common ancestors of humans, when traced back using the Y-chromosome for the male lineage and mitochondrial DNA for the female lineage, are commonly called the Y-chromosomal Adam and Mitochondrial Eve, respectively. These do not fork from a single couple at the same epoch even if the names were borrowed from the Tanakh.

Family tree of Adam and Eve

See also

 Adam and Eve in Mormonism
 Hebat
 Mitochondrial Eve
 Old Testament Pseudepigrapha:
 Apocalypse of Adam
 Books of Adam
 Conflict of Adam and Eve with Satan
 Life of Adam and Eve
 Testament of Adam
 Ophidiophilia
 Paradise Lost
 Pre-Adamite
 Shatarupa
 Tomb of Eve

References

Bibliography

  A translation with commentary.
 Flood, John (2010). Representations of Eve in Antiquity and the English Middle Ages. Routledge.
 
 

 
 Norris, Pamela (1998). The Story of Eve. MacMillan Books.
 Pagels, Elaine (1989). Adam, Eve and the Serpent. Vintage Books.
 Paulinus Minorita. Compendium.
 
 

 Eve
Bereshit (parashah)
Book of Genesis people
Christian female saints from the Old Testament
Women in the Hebrew Bible
Mythological first humans
Hebrew Bible people in Mandaeism